Aclis tenuis is a species of sea snail, a marine gastropod mollusk in the family Eulimidae.

Distribution
This species occurs in the Northwest Atlantic Ocean off the Gulf of Maine and the Gulf of St. Lawrence.

Description 
The maximum recorded shell length is 4.6 mm.

Habitat 
Minimum recorded depth is 91 m. Maximum recorded depth is 3235 m.

References

 Dall W. H. (1927). Small shells from dredgings off the southeast coast of the United states by the United States Fisheries Steamer "Albatross", in 1885 and 1886. Proceedings of the United States National Museum, 70(18): 1-134
 Brunel, P., Bosse, L. & Lamarche, G. (1998). Catalogue of the marine invertebrates of the estuary and Gulf of St. Lawrence. Canadian Special Publication of Fisheries and Aquatic Sciences, 126. 405 p.

Eulimidae
Gastropods described in 1882